Ramon Daniel Pennington (December 22, 1933October 7, 2020) was an American country music singer, songwriter, and record producer. He is known for writing the song "I'm a Ramblin' Man", and for founding the independent Step One Records label.

Career
Pennington first performed in a western swing band called the Western Rhythm Boys, which performed in Ohio. In 1958, he signed with King Records and released "Three Hearts in a Tangle" under the name Ray Starr. However, Pennington was dissatisfied with the recording, so he asked that it be withdrawn as a single. Pennington then took up record producer and artists and repertoire jobs at the label, including a production credit on Hawkshaw Hawkins' final album, Lonesome 7-7203, one of the first country albums to feature both black and white session musicians. He also produced for The Stanley Brothers and Reno and Smiley, also playing drums for the latter.

Roy Drusky covered "Three Hearts in a Tangle", taking his rendition to number 2 on the country charts in 1961. Pennington continued to perform in both the Western Rhythm Boys and another band called the Starliners. He also worked at a record store and released a rhythm and blues single called "I Have to Laugh to Keep from Crying", also under the name Ray Starr.

Pennington moved to Nashville, Tennessee, in 1964, where he worked at Pamper Music, producing for Tex Williams and Kenny Price, who recorded two of Pennington's songs: "Walking on New Grass" and "Happy Tracks". Pennington signed to Capitol Records in 1966 as a recording artist, charting three songs (including the number 29 "I'm a Ramblin' Man") before leaving. He moved to Monument Records in 1969, where he charted five more times, but soon left that label to work at RCA Records. While at RCA, Waylon Jennings covered "I'm a Ramblin' Man" and took it to number 1, as Pennington continued to work as a producer for RCA artists such as Billy Walker and Norma Jean. Pennington charted his last solo single, "She Wanted a Little Bit More", on MRC Records in 1978. He later founded the duo Bluestone with Jerry McBee, and charted "Haven't I Loved You Somewhere Before".

In 1984, Pennington co-founded Step One Records with Mel Holt. Ray Price was the first act signed to the label, and fiddler Clinton Gregory charted three Top 30 hits while on Step One. Western Flyer, Celinda Pink and The Geezinslaws were also among the label's roster.

While on Step One, Pennington recorded multiple albums with the Swing Shift Band, co-founded with steel guitarist Buddy Emmons. This band charted with "Turn Me Loose and Let Me Swing" in 1988. Step One closed in 1998.

Death
Pennington died on October 7, 2020, at his home in Hendersonville, Tennessee.  He was 86, and died after entering a garage that had caught fire.  His wife, Mama Charlotte, was able to escape unharmed.

Discography

Albums
Source: AllMusic

In the Swing Shift Band
Source: AllMusic

Singles
Source: AllMusic

References

External links
 
 Entries at 45cat.com

1933 births
2020 deaths
American country singer-songwriters
American male singer-songwriters
Capitol Records artists
Monument Records artists
Country musicians from Kentucky
People from Clay County, Kentucky
Step One Records artists
American country record producers
Singer-songwriters from Kentucky
Record producers from Kentucky
20th-century American singers
20th-century American male singers
Accidental deaths in Tennessee
Deaths from fire in the United States